Jose Maria Rubio (22 July 1864 – 2 May 1929) was a Spanish Jesuit, known as the Apostle of Madrid by the Bishop of Madrid. He was canonised in 2003 by Pope John Paul II.

Childhood and adolescence 
Son of farmers and the oldest of thirteen brothers, born to Francisco Rubio and Mercedes Peralta, he grew up in the town of Dalías, in Almería, until he entered the seminary of Almeria, where he studied Human Studies and one year of Philosophy (1876–1879).  He then studied Philosophy and Theology for four years at Granada (1879–1886), where he was sponsored and protected by the professor and canon Joaquin Torres Asensio. On Ascensio's move to Madrid, Rubio followed his professor to study theology for a fifth year (1886–1887).  He obtained a degree in theology in 1896 and a doctorate in Canon Law from Toledo in 1897.

Priest in suburban Madrid 
Ordained priest, he celebrated his first Mass on October 12 (1887) on the altar of the conversion of San Luis Gonzaga of the then Cathedral of San Isidro of Madrid, the diocese where he worked for three years as curate at Chinchón (1887–1889) and pastor at Estremera (1889–1890). In both villages he was notable for its extreme austerity, his catechesis of children, and service of the poorest.

Later, as Chaplain of Bernardine nuns in the church of the Sacrament of Madrid, Almudena parish, he became distinguished by his activity in the suburbs of the capital with the cleaners and "dressmakers". He also taught Latin literature, pastoral theology and metaphysics (1890–1894) at the seminary in Madrid, and was a notary and registrar of the vicariate of the diocese. A journey as a pilgrim to Holy Land and Rome (1904) left on him an indelible mark. During this period he described himself as a "fan of the Jesuits", because since his time as a student of theology at Granada he had wanted to join this Order, to the point of becoming confused as such among the those who organize clerical famous riot after the theatrical representation of the "Electra" of Galdós.

Anecdotes in the life of José María Rubio 
Rubio was a famed confessor. The locals were willing to queue for several hours to be shriven by Fr. Rubio.

VISIT TO A DYING

While confessing, a lady came and gave him the directions to a man who had to confess soon, as he was dying. That evening, Rubio went to visit the dying, and following the directions, he had to go to a third floor without a lift. When he finally arrived, knocked and asked for the gentleman, "It's me" the gentleman said "but I think that someone has played a practical joke on you, as you see I'm in perfect health. Come on, man! have a drink and relax after you have had to climb so many stairs." Entering the room, Rubio saw a portrait on the wall, and while the man served him a drink. Rubio said that the lady was the one who sent him. The man laughed and said that the lady was his mother who died some years ago. Then, the gentleman said; "Look, anyway, as you are here, I'm going to confess because it's been years since I entered a church, and so your journey will not have been in vain". He confessed and died that night.

THE SEAMSTRESS

A seamstress from Madrid told in confession that her father hated the faith, and considered the Christian religion a swindle and a lie. Thus, she was afraid of the eternal damnation of her father. Rubio said that she should not be worried, as her father would be saved.

Some days after the confession, during a retreat and preaching, that seamstress came late. At the moment when she arrived, Rubio paused for a moment in his speech and said in loud voice: "At this very moment one of you just received a very special grace. Really very, very big. In a few days you will know what it is and whoever of you has received this, that lucky person has to thank our Lord Jesus Christ".

All women who were there present took note of the time and day, as he was already famous for these prophecies that were fulfilled.  The seamstress in a few days noticed that his father died holy, and just at that time when Rubio was preaching, her father was confessing and receiving the last sacraments.

His last years 
When his protector, Torres Asensio, died, he managed to fulfill his old desire to join the Jesuits in Granada, where, after the novitiate (1909), he reviewed his theology for a year and had a pastoral experience in Seville. Aftertertianship (1910–1911) in Manresa (Barcelona), he was sent to Madrid, where he took final vows at his residence at Calle de la Flor Baja and where lived the rest of his life.

He was a withdrawn and a modest man, of great charity and tireless devotion to work. He excelled as a preacher (though not for his oratorical skills) and as a regular confessor, which caused long lines of faithful who were looking for support and spiritual help.  Despite the lack of brilliant human qualities, which contrasted with his housemates, his effectiveness and reputation grew quickly throughout the city. He was noted for his love of the poor, who came forward for help. He developed his evangelical work in towns and suburbs, and founded and organized several associations such as the "Guard of Honor of the Sacred Heart," the work of the "Marys of the Tabernacles", and social schools in Ventilla neighborhoods, aided by young teachers Juan and Demetrio de Andrés, known as "Ventilla martyrs" killed during the Civil War, 1936.

He died in Madrid on May 2, 1929, sitting in a pine armchair, after directing that his spiritual notes be burned. When he died, the Archbishop of Madrid, Leopoldo Eijo y Garay, called him "apostle of Madrid" and wrote a pastoral letter on his example to the clergy of his diocese.

His canonization 
During his life miraculous events were reported, such as bilocation, healings, prophecy and clairvoyance, some, perhaps legendary, but others ratified by numerous witnesses. What dominates is the testimony of his example and his word next to the message that holiness is available to all who simply surrender to the will of God. His ultimate favorite was: "Do what God wants and want what God does."

Beatified by John Paul II in Rome (October 6, 1985) and canonized in Madrid by the same pontiff (May 4, 2003), his remains are venerated in the church of San Francisco de Borja and the Sacred Heart of the Society of Jesus in Madrid. The extraordinary fact, considered as a miracle by the Congregation for the Causes of Saints in order for his canonization, was the healing of lung cancer of the Jesuit José Luis Gómez Munten (1988).

Reflection by José María Rubio

References

Jesuit saints
1864 births
1929 deaths
Spanish Roman Catholic saints
20th-century Christian saints
Venerated Catholics by Pope John Paul II